Michiaki (written: 倫明, 道明, 道章, 道秋 or 宙明) is a masculine Japanese given name. Notable people with the name include:

 (born 1972), Japanese voice actor
 (born 1977), Japanese footballer
 (1890–1947), Imperial Japanese Navy admiral
 (born 1970), Japanese judoka
, Japanese composer

Japanese masculine given names